Westminster Abbey is a large Anglican church in Westminster, London, where the British monarchs are crowned.

Westminster Abbey may also refer to:
Westminster Abbey (UK Parliament constituency), a former London constituency of the UK parliament
Westminster Abbey (London County Council constituency), a former London constituency of the London County Council
Westminster Abbey (British Columbia), a monastic community

See also
Westminster Abbey Choir School, London
Westminster Abbey Museum, London
Westminster Cathedral, also in London, the mother church of the Catholic Church in England and Wales
 the Palace of Westminster, the meeting place of the two houses of the Parliament of the United Kingdom